Tipaimukh (Vidhan Sabha constituency) is one of the 60 Vidhan Sabha constituencies in the Indian state of Manipur.

Members of Assembly 
 1972: Ngurdinglien, Independent
 1974: Ngurdinglien, Indian National Congress
 1980: Ngurdinglien, Indian National Congress
 1984: Ngurdinglien, Independent
 1990: Selkai Hrangchal, Janata Dal
 1995: Dr. Chaltonlien Amo, Indian National Congress
 2000: Ngursanglur, National Congress Party
 2002: Dr. Chaltonlien Amo, Indian National Congress
 2007: Ngursanglur, Rashtriya Janata Dal
 2012: Dr. Chaltonlien Amo, Indian National Congress

 2022 : Ngursanglur Sanate, JD(U)

Election results

2022 
 Manipur legislative Assembly election, 2022: Tipaimukh

{{Election box with winning candidate with party link |
 | Candidate = Ngursanglur Sanate 
 | Party     = JD(U)
 | Vote      = 3702

{{ Election box candidate with party link |
 | Candidate = Chalton Lien Amo
 | Party     = BJP
 | Vote      = 3301

2017

See also
 Churachandpur district
Manipur Legislative Assembly
List of constituencies of Manipur Legislative Assembly

References

External link
 

Assembly constituencies of Manipur
Churachandpur district